Vicente Alvares ( – 19 November 1738) was a Goan Catholic born in Belbatta, in the island of Chorão in 1680. He was a medical practitioner and chemist of his Majesty John V of Portugal. In 1713, he accompanied the General of the Arraial of Ponda, Antonio do Amaral Sarmento, to Sunda in Kanara. He would supply medicines free of charge to all army men and auxiliaries in Salcette. After the death of his second wife, he entered the priesthood and died in Margão on the 19th of November 1738.

Biography 
Vincent Alvares was Son of Sr. António Rafael Álvares and Antónia Dias Husband of Joana Marcelina Correia and Úrsula Francisca Moniz Father of Manuel Caetano Alvares; Mariana Álvares; Maria Benedita Álvares; Ana Josefa Alvares e Barreto and Caetano José Álvares

Alvares was a Medical practitioner and Chemist of his Majesty John V of Portugal. He was issued letter to practice by the chief physician of Goa. He accompanied the General of the Arraial of Ponda, Antonio do Amaral Sarmento to Sunda in Kanara in 1713 in Salsette supplying medicines free of charge to all army men and auxiliaries. After the death of his wife he entered the priesthood and died in Margão on 19 November 1738.

Family 
Alvares was a descendant of Lourenço Alvares, a Brahmin from Querem who converted to Roman Catholicism. His son, Manuel Caetano Alvares, was the first and only Goan to be given capelo gratuito of the Faculty of Medicine by an order issued by King Joseph I of Portugal.

References

Bibliography
The Island of Chorão (A Historical Sketch) By Francisco Xavier Gomes Catão,  Mar Louis Memorial Press, Alwaye (1962)
Health and Hygiene in Colonial Goa, 1510-1961 By Fatima da Silva Gracias (1994)

References

People of Chorão (Island)
Portuguese people of Goan descent
1680 births
1738 deaths
Scholars from Goa
18th-century Indian scholars